The 1991–92 Libyan Premier League was contested between August 1991 and May 1992. The league was composed of 21 teams. Each of these teams played each other once, meaning each side played 20 matches. The 21 sides that competed in this season were:

Al Ahly Tripoli
Al Ahly Benghazi
Al Madina
Darnes
Al Wahda
Al Ittihad Tripoli
Al Murooj
Al Ittihad Gheryan
Al Nasr
Al Hilal
Rafik Sorman
Al Mahalla
Al Tersana
Al Akhdar
Al Afriqi
Al Sweahly
Al Suqoor
Al Dhahra
Al Tahaddi
Al Ittihad Taajoura
Al-Shorta Tripoli

League table

Libyan Premier League seasons
1
Libya